The Main Hall is a historic building located on the campus of Randolph College in Lynchburg, Virginia.  It was built between 1891 and 1911, and is a large Queen Anne style brick building complex.  The central entrance tower and eastern wings were constructed between 1891–1893. Two additional wings were added to the west in 1896. With the erection of a wing to the west in 1899, the building was completed according to the original plan. In 1911 an annex was added to the rear of the entrance pavilion. Further additions and renovations were made to the north elevation in 1936.  Its most distinctive features is the central entrance tower with a front portico and topped by a parapet wall and capped by a classically inspired wooden cupola, crowned by a finial.

It was listed on the National Register of Historic Places in 1979.

References

University and college buildings on the National Register of Historic Places in Virginia
Queen Anne architecture in Virginia
School buildings completed in 1891
Buildings and structures in Lynchburg, Virginia
National Register of Historic Places in Lynchburg, Virginia
University and college administration buildings in the United States